Mulino may refer to:
Daniel Mulino (b. 1969), Australian politician
Mulino, Russia, several rural localities in Russia
Mulino, Oregon, a hamlet in Oregon, United States
Mulino State Airport, a public airport in Oregon, United States